The International Turbine Engine Company LLC (ITEC, formerly the International Turbine Engine Corporation) is a joint venture between Honeywell Aerospace (formerly Garrett AiResearch, and later AlliedSignal), and the Aerospace Industrial Development Corporation (AIDC). The company produces the F124/F125 turbofan engine series, which is used in the Aermacchi M-346, Aero L-159 Alca, AIDC F-CK-1 Ching-kuo, and AIDC T-5 Brave Eagle. In 2017 the F124 and F125 Engines reached 1,000,000 operating hours.

Products
 Honeywell F124 - standard
 Honeywell F125 - with afterburner

See also 
 Defense industry of Taiwan

References

External links
 Honeywell Tests First Production Configuration F124-GA-200
 Honeywell F124 Product Page

Honeywell
Aerospace Industrial Development Corporation
Defence companies of Taiwan